Enoclerus coccineus is a species of checkered beetle in the family Cleridae. It is found in Central America and North America.

Subspecies
 Enoclerus coccineus coccineus (Schenkling, 1906)
 Enoclerus coccineus desertus Barr, 1976

References

Further reading

 
 
 

Clerinae
Beetles described in 1906